The Dutch West India Company (the GWC or WIC;) was a chartered company of Dutch merchants as well as foreign investors. Among its founders was Willem Usselincx (1567–1647) and Jessé de Forest (1576–1624). On 3 June 1621, it was granted a charter for a trade monopoly in the Dutch West Indies by the Republic of the Seven United Netherlands and given jurisdiction over Dutch participation in the Atlantic slave trade, Brazil, the Caribbean, and North America. 

The area where the company could operate consisted of West Africa (between the Tropic of Cancer and the Cape of Good Hope) and the Americas, which included the Pacific Ocean and the eastern part of New Guinea. The intended purpose of the charter was to eliminate competition, particularly Spanish or Portuguese, between the various trading posts established by the merchants. The company became instrumental in the largely ephemeral Dutch colonization of the Americas (including New Netherland) in the seventeenth century. 

From 1624 to 1654, in the context of the Dutch–Portuguese War, the GWC held Portuguese territory in northeast Brazil, but they were ousted from Dutch Brazil following fierce resistance. After several reversals, the GWC reorganized and a new charter was granted in 1675, largely on the strength in the Atlantic slave trade. This "new" version lasted for more than a century, until after the Fourth Anglo–Dutch War, during which it lost most of its assets.

Origins

When the Dutch East India Company (VOC) was founded in 1602, some traders in Amsterdam did not agree with its monopolistic policies. With help from Petrus Plancius, a Dutch-Flemish astronomer, cartographer, and clergyman, they sought for a northeastern or northwestern access to Asia to circumvent the VOC monopoly. In 1609, English explorer Henry Hudson, in employment of the VOC, landed on the coast of New England and sailed up what is now known as the Hudson River in his quest for the Northwest Passage to Asia. However, he failed to find a passage. Consequently, in 1615, Isaac Le Maire and Samuel Blommaert, assisted by others, focused on finding a south-westerly route around South America's Tierra del Fuego archipelago in order to circumvent the monopoly of the VOC.

One of the first sailors who focused on trade with Africa was Balthazar de Moucheron. The trade with Africa offered several possibilities to set up trading posts or factories, an important starting point for negotiations. It was Blommaert, however, who stated that, in 1600, eight companies sailed on the coast of Africa, competing with each other for the supply of copper, from the Kingdom of Loango. Pieter van den Broecke was employed by one of these companies. In 1612, a Dutch fortress was built in Mouree (present day Ghana), along the Dutch Gold Coast.

Trade with the Caribbean, for salt, sugar and tobacco, was hampered by Spain and delayed because of peace negotiations. Spain offered peace on condition that the Dutch Republic would withdraw from trading with Asia and America. Spain refused to sign the peace treaty if a West Indian Company would be established. At this time, the Dutch War of Independence (1568–1648) between Spain and the Dutch Republic was occurring. Grand Pensionary Johan van Oldenbarnevelt offered to suspend trade with the West Indies in exchange for the Twelve Years' Truce. He took the proposal of founding a West-India Company off table. The result was that, during a few years, the Dutch sailed under a foreign flag to South America. However, ten years later, Stadtholder Maurice of Orange, proposed to continue the war with Spain, but also to distract attention from Spain to the Republic. In 1619, his opponent Johan van Oldenbarnevelt was beheaded, and when in April 1621 the truce expired, the West Indian Company could be established.

The West India Company received its charter from the States-General in June 1621, granting it a 24-year monopoly on trade and colonization that included the American coast between Newfoundland and the Straits of Magellan. One of the promotors all these years was Reynier Pauw who was one of the judges in the Trial of Oldenbarnevelt, Grotius and Hogerbeets. He appointed two of his sons as the first managers in 1621; both Pieter and Michael Reyniersz Pauw were in function for fifteen years. Reynier Pauw jr, Cornelis Bicker and Samuel Blommaert were appointed in 1622.

The West India Company

The Dutch West India Company was organized similarly to the Dutch East India Company (VOC). Like the VOC, the GWC had five offices, called chambers (kamers), in Amsterdam, Rotterdam, Hoorn, Middelburg and Groningen, of which the chambers in Amsterdam and Middelburg contributed most to the company. The board consisted of 19 members, known as the Heeren XIX (the Nineteen Gentlemen). The institutional structure of the GWC followed the federal structure, which entailed extensive discussion for any decision, with regional representation: 8 from Amsterdam; 4 from Zeeland, 2 each from the Northern Quarter (Hoorn and Enkhuizen), the Maas (Rotterdam, Delft and Dordrecht), the region of Groningen, and one representative from the States General. Each region had its own chamber and board of directors. The validity of the charter was set at 24 years.

Only in 1623 was funding arranged, after several bidders were put under pressure. The States General of the Netherlands and the VOC pledged one million guilders in the form of capital and subsidy. Although Iberian writers said that crypto-Jews or Marranos played an important role in the formation of both the VOC and the GWC, research has shown that initially they played a minor role, but expanded during the period of the Dutch in Brazil. Emigrant Calvinists from the Spanish Netherlands did make significant investments in the GWC. Investors did not rush to put their money in the company in 1621, but the States-General urged municipalities and other institutions to invest. Explanations for the slow investment by individuals were that shareholders had "no control over the directors' policy and the handling of ordinary investors' money," that it was a "racket" to provide "cushy posts for the directors and their relatives, at the expense of ordinary shareholders". The VOC directors invested money in the GWC, without consulting their shareholders, causing dissent among a number of shareholders. In order to attract foreign shareholders, the GWC offered equal standing to foreign investors with Dutch, resulting in shareholders from France, Switzerland, and Venice. A translation of the original 1621 charter appeared in English, Orders and Articles granted by the High and Mightie Lords the States General of the United Provinces concerning the erecting of a West-Indies Companie, Anno Dom. MDCXII. by 1623, the capital for the GWC at 2.8 million florins was not as great the VOC's original capitalization of 6.5 million, but it was still a substantial sum. The GWC had 15 ships to carry trade and plied the west African coast and Brazil.

Unlike the VOC, the GWC had no right to deploy military troops. When the Twelve Years' Truce in 1621 was over, the Republic had a free hand to re-wage war with Spain. A Groot Desseyn ("grand design") was devised to seize the Portuguese colonies in Africa and the Americas, so as to dominate the sugar and slave trade. When this plan failed, privateering became one of the major goals within the GWC. The arming of merchant ships with guns and soldiers to defend themselves against Spanish ships was of great importance. On almost all ships in 1623, 40 to 50 soldiers were stationed, possibly to assist in the hijacking of enemy ships. It is unclear whether the first expedition was the expedition by Jacques l'Hermite to the coast of Chile, Peru and Bolivia, set up by Stadtholder Maurice with the support of the States General and the VOC.

The company was initially a dismal failure, in terms of its expensive early projects, and its directors shifted emphasis from conquest of territory to pursue plunder of shipping. The most spectacular success for the GWC was Piet Heyn's seizure of the Spanish silver fleet, which carried silver from Spanish colonies to Spain. He had also seized a consignment of sugar from Brazil and a galleon from Honduras with cacao, indigo, and other valuable goods. Privateering was its most profitable activity in the late 1620s. Despite Heyn's success at plunder, the company's directors realized that it was not a basis to build long-term profit, leading them to renew their attempts to seize Iberian territory in the Americas. They decided their target was Brazil.

There were conflicts between directors from different areas of The Netherlands, with Amsterdam less supportive of the company. Non-maritime cities, including Haarlem, Leiden, and Gouda, along with Enkhuizen and Hoorn were enthusiastic about seizing territory. They sent a fleet to Brazil, capturing Olinda and Pernambuco in 1630 in their initial foray to create a Dutch Brazil, but could not hold them due to a strong Portuguese resistance. Company ships continued privateering in the Caribbean, as well seizing vital land resources, particularly salt pans. The company's general lack of success saw their shares plummet and the Dutch and The Spanish renewed truce talks in 1633.

In 1629, the GWC gave permission to a number of investors in New Netherlands to found patroonships, enabled by the Charter of Freedoms and Exemptions which was ratified by the Dutch States General on June 7, 1629. The patroonships were created to help populate the colony, by providing investors grants providing land for approximately 50 people "upwards of 15 years old", per grant, mainly in the region of New Netherland. Patroon investors could expand the size of their land grants as large as 4 miles, "along the shore or along one bank of a navigable river..." Rensselaerswyck was the most successful Dutch West India Company patroonship.

The New Netherland area, which included New Amsterdam, covered parts of present-day New York, Connecticut, Delaware, and New Jersey. Other settlements were established on the Netherlands Antilles, and in South America, in Dutch Brazil, Suriname and Guyana. In Africa, posts were established on the Gold Coast (now Ghana), the Slave Coast (now Benin), and briefly in Angola. It was a neo-feudal system, where patrons were permitted considerable powers to control the overseas colony. In the Americas, fur (North America) and sugar (South America) were the most important trade goods, while African settlements traded the enslaved (mainly destined for the plantations on the Antilles and Suriname), gold, and ivory.

Decline

In North America, the settlers Albert Burgh, Samuel Blommaert, Samuel Godijn, Johannes de Laet had little success with populating the colony of New Netherland, and to defend themselves against local Amerindians. Only Kiliaen Van Rensselaer managed to maintain his settlement in the north along the Hudson. Samuel Blommaert secretly tried to secure his interests with the founding of the colony of New Sweden on behalf of Sweden on the Delaware in the south. The main focus of the GWC now went to Brazil.

Only in 1630 did the West India Company manage to conquer a part of Brazil. In 1630, the colony of New Holland (capital Mauritsstad, present-day Recife) was founded, taking over Portuguese possessions in Brazil. In the meantime, the war demanded so many of its forces that the company had to operate under a permanent threat of bankruptcy. In fact, the GWC went bankrupt in 1636 and all attempts at rehabilitation were doomed to failure.

Because of the ongoing war in Brazil, the situation for the GWC in 1645, at the end of the charter, was very bad. An attempt to compensate the losses of the GWC with the profits of the VOC failed because the directors of the VOC did not want to. In 1645, the main participants in the GWC were members of the Trip family. Merging the two companies was not feasible. Amsterdam was not willing to help out, because it had too much interest in peace and healthy trade relations with Portugal. This indifferent attitude of Amsterdam was the main cause of the slow, half-hearted policy, which would eventually lead to losing the colony. In 1647, the company made a restart using 1.5 million guilders, capital of the VOC. The States General took responsibility for the warfare in Brazil.

Due to the Peace of Westphalia, the attacks on Spanish shipping were forbidden to the GWC. Many merchants from Amsterdam and Zeeland decided to work with marine and merchants from the Holy Roman Empire, Denmark–Norway, England and other European countries. In 1649, the GWC obtained a monopoly on gold and enslaved Africans with the kingdom of Accra (present-day Ghana). In 1662, the GWC obtained several asiento contracts with the Spanish Crown, under which the Dutch were obliged to deliver 24,000 enslaved Africans. The influence of the GWC in Africa was threatened during the Second and Third Anglo–Dutch Wars, but English efforts to displace the Dutch from the region ultimately proved unsuccessful.

The first West India Company suffered a long agony, and its end in 1674 was painless. The reason that the GWC could drag on for twenty years was due to its valuable West African possessions, due to its slaves.

New West India Company

When the GWC could not repay its debts in 1674, the company was dissolved. But due to continued high demand for trade between West Africa and the Dutch colonies in the Americas (mainly slave trade), a second West India Company known as the New West India Company was chartered that same year. This new company controlled the same trade area as the first. All ships, fortresses, etc. were taken over by the new company. The number of directors was reduced from 19 to 10, and the number of governors from 74 to 50. By 1679, the new GWC had slightly more than  guilders which was largely supplied by the Amsterdam Chamber.

From 1694 until 1700, the GWC waged a long conflict against the Eguafo Kingdom along the Gold Coast, present-day Ghana. The Komenda Wars drew in significant numbers of neighbouring African kingdoms and led to the replacement of the gold trade with enslaved Africans.

After the Fourth Anglo–Dutch War, it became apparent that the Dutch West India Company was no longer capable of defending its own colonies, as Sint Eustatius, Berbice, Essequibo, Demerara, and some forts on the Dutch Gold Coast were rapidly taken by the British. In 1791, the company's stock was bought by the Dutch government, and on 1 January 1792, all territories previously held by the Dutch West India Company came under the rule of the States General of the Dutch Republic. Around 1800 there was an attempt to create a third West Indian Company, without success.

See also

 Atlantic World
 Atlantic slave trade
 Charter of Freedoms and Exemptions
 Dutch colonization of the Americas
 Dutch East India Company
 Dutch–Portuguese War
 Economic history of the Netherlands (1500–1815)
 List of director generals of New Netherland
 List of trading companies
 New Holland (Acadia)
 Recapture of Bahia

Notes

References

Further reading

Boxer, Charles R., The Dutch in Brazil, 1624-1654. Oxford: Clarendon Press 1957.
Ebert, Christopher. "Dutch Trade with Brazil before the Dutch West India Company, 1587–1621." Riches from Atlantic Commerce: Dutch Transatlantic Trade and Shipping (2003): 1585–1817.
Emmer, Pieter C. "The West India Company, 1621–1791: Dutch or Atlantic?." Companies and trade: Essays on overseas trading companies during the ancien régime (1981): 71–95.
Emmer, Pieter C. The Dutch in the Atlantic economy, 1580-1880: Trade, slavery and emancipation. Vol. 614. Variorum, 1998.
Frijhoff, W. Th M. "The West India Company and the Reformed Church: Neglect or Concern?." (1997).
 Groesen, Michiel van, (ed.) "The Legacy of Dutch Brazil", Cambridge University Press, 2014.
 Groesen, Michiel van "Amsterdam's Atlantic: Print Culture and the Making of Dutch Brazil", University of Pennsylvania Press, 2017.
Heijer, Henk den. "The Dutch West India Company, 1621–1791." in Johannes Postma and Victor Enthoven, eds. Riches From Atlantic Commerce: Dutch Transatlantic Trade and Shipping, 1585-1817. Leiden: Brill 2003, 77–114.
_. "The West African Trade of the Dutch West Indian Company 1674-1740," in Postma and Enthoven, eds. Riches from Atlantic Commerce, pp. Leiden: Brill 2003, pp. 139–69.
 Klooster, Wim. The Dutch Moment: War, Trade, and Settlement in the Seventeenth-Century Atlantic World. (Cornell University Press, 2016). 419 pp.
Meuwese, Marcus P. " For the Peace and Well-Being of the Country": Intercultural Mediators and Dutch-Indian Relations in New Netherland and Dutch Brazil, 1600–1664. Diss. University of Notre Dame, 2003.
 
 Peltries or plantations: the economic policies of the Dutch West India Company in New Netherland, 1623-1639. Baltimore: Johns Hopkins Press, 1969.
Pijning, Erst. "Idealism and Power: The Dutch West India Company in the Brazil trade (1630-1654)," in Allen L. Macinnes and Arthur H. William (eds.) Shaping the Stuart World, 1603-1714: The Atlantic Connection. Leiden: Brill 2006, 207–32.
Postma, Johannes. "West-African Exports and the Dutch West India Company, 1675–1731." Economisch-en sociaal-historisch jaarboek 36 (1973).
Postma, Johannes. "The dimension of the Dutch slave trade from Western Africa." The Journal of African History 13.02 (1972): 237–248.
Rink, Oliver A. "Private Interest and Godly Gain: The West India Company and the Dutch Reformed Church in New Netherland, 1624-1664." New York History 75.3 (1994): 245.
Ryder, Alan Frederick Charles. "Dutch trade on the Nigerian coast during the seventeenth century." Journal of the Historical Society of Nigeria 3.2 (1965): 195–210.
Rutten, Alphons MG. Dutch transatlantic medicine trade in the eighteenth century under the cover of the West India Company. Erasmus Pub., 2000.
 Schmidt, Benjamin, Innocence Abroad: The Dutch Imagination and the New World, 1570-1670, Cambridge: University Press, 2001. 
Van den Boogaart, Ernst. Infernal Allies: The Dutch West India Company and the Tarairiu, 1631-1654. 1980.
Van Hoboken, W. J. "The Dutch West India Company: the political background of its rise and decline." Britain and the Netherlands 1 (1960): 41–61.
Visscher, Nic Joh. A Bibliographical and Historical Essay on the Dutch Books and Pamphlets Relating to New-Netherland, and to the Dutch West-India Company and to Its Possessions in Brazil, Angola Etc., as Also on the Maps, Charts, Etc. of New-Netherland. Muller, 1867.
Weslager, Clinton Alfred. Dutch explorers, traders and settlers in the Delaware Valley, 1609-1664. University of Pennsylvania Press, 1961.
Zandvliet, Kees. Mapping for money: maps, plans, and topographic paintings and their role in Dutch Overseas Expansion during the 16th and 17th Centuries. Amsterdam: Batavian Lion International, 1998.

External links

 Dutch Portuguese Colonial History Dutch Portuguese Colonial History: history of the Portuguese and the Dutch in Ceylon, India, Malacca, Bengal, Formosa, Africa, Brazil. Language Heritage, lists of remains, maps.
 Facsimile of 15 GWC books Relating about the events in Brazil in the 17th century (PT & NL)
 GWC ship halve maan The GWC ship the Halve Maan.
 Charter of the Dutch West India Company Text of the Charter of the Dutch West India Company: 1621
 Netherlands West India Company GWC
 Atlas of Mutual Heritage - online atlas of VOC and GWC settlements

Dutch West India Company
Chartered companies
Defunct companies of the Netherlands
Dutch colonisation in Africa
Dutch colonization of the Americas
History of the Dutch Caribbean
Curaçao and Dependencies
Dutch Gold Coast
Dutch colonisation of the Guianas
New Netherland
History of West Africa
African slave trade
Fur trade
Former monopolies
Trading companies of the Dutch Republic
Companies based in Amsterdam
Shipping companies of the Dutch Republic
Companies formerly listed on Euronext Amsterdam
Companies established in 1621
Trading companies disestablished in the 18th century
1621 establishments in the Dutch Republic
1792 disestablishments in the Dutch Republic
Military history of the Dutch Republic
Military history of the Dutch Empire
Maritime history of the Dutch Republic
History of the Dutch Empire
Exploration of North America
Netherlands–United Kingdom relations
Netherlands–United States relations
Netherlands–Suriname relations
Netherlands–Spain relations
Netherlands–Portugal relations
Trading companies established in the 17th century